The 1904 Victorian state election was held in the Australian state of Victoria on 1 June 1904 to elect 67 members to the state's Legislative Assembly.

It was the first election to be held in Victoria since the passing of the Constitution Act 1903 (also known as the "Constitution Reform Act"), which reduced the number of seats in the Legislative Assembly from 95 to 67 and removed all two-member electorates. It also created three new electorates representing public and railways officers: the Electoral province for Public Officers and Railway Officers the "Electoral district for Public Officers" and a two-member "Electoral district for Railway Officers". Members of the public service had previously not been eligible to stand as candidates without first resigning. Under these changes, they could stand while a state employee, and if successful in winning a seat, would have a leave of absence while sitting as an MP.

Background
Ministerialists were a group of members of parliament who supported a government in office but were not bound by tight party discipline. Ministerialists represented loose pre-party groupings who held seats in state parliaments up to 1914. Such members ran for office as independents or under a variety of political labels but saw themselves as linked to other candidates by their support for a particular premier or government.

Thomas Bent was elected on 16 February 1904 leader of the Commonwealth Liberal Party, replacing Premier William Irvine who went into federal politics, and went into the election as the incumbent Premier. At the June 1904 election Bent won a comfortable majority with 35 of the 67 seats, and the Labour Party became the second largest party in the Assembly with 17 seats.

Results

Legislative Assembly 

|}

See also
Members of the Victorian Legislative Assembly, 1904–1907

References

1904 elections in Australia
Elections in Victoria (Australia)
1900s in Victoria (Australia)
June 1904 events